A steam separator, sometimes referred to as a moisture separator or steam drier, is a device for separating water droplets from steam.  The simplest type of steam separator is the steam dome on a steam locomotive.  Stationary boilers and nuclear reactors may have more complex devices which impart a "spin" to the steam so that water droplets are thrown outwards by centrifugal force and collected. All separators require steam traps to collect the water droplets that they remove.

It is important to remove water droplets from steam because:
 In all engines, wet steam reduces the thermal efficiency
 In piston engines, water can accumulate in the cylinders and cause a hydraulic lock which will damage the engine
 In thermal power stations, water droplets in high velocity steam coming from nozzles (or vanes) in a steam turbine can impinge on and erode turbine internals such as turbine blades. 
 In other steam-using industrial machinery, water can accumulate in piping and cause steam hammer: a form of water hammer caused by water build up 'plugging' a pipe then being accelerated by the steam flowing through the pipe until it reaches a sharp bend and results in catastrophic failure of the pipe.

Steam drier is also sometimes applied to a drier which operates as a low-temperature superheater, adding heat to the steam.

Applications
 Engines
 Boilers
 Turbines
 Rubber vulcanizing machines
 Steam-powered irons
 Cooking processes using a steamer
 Atomizers
 Catalyzing systems
 Other steam systems

See also 
 Steam dryer, a device for drying another material, such as laundry or a biomass fuel, with the use of hot steam, rather than for drying steam.

Sources
 Nuclear Encyclopedia article
 Separators and their Role in the Steam System

Steam boiler components
Boilers
Steam power
Nuclear reactors